Hidden Treasures Fanta Miss Nepal 2014, the 17th Miss Nepal beauty pageant was held on 2 May 2014 at the Nepal Academy Hall in Kathmandu. Miss Nepal 2013 Ishani Shrestha crowned her successor as Miss Nepal World 2014, who will represent Nepal at Miss World 2014 with 1st runner up as Miss Nepal Earth 2014 sent to Miss Earth 2014 and 2nd runner up as Miss Nepal International 2014 to Miss International 2014.

The winner of Miss Nepal 2014 will be selected as the brand ambassador of drink, Fanta; WWF Nepal for a year and win Rs 100,000. The auditions of Miss Nepal was held in various regional contests like Miss Pokhara, Miss Chitwan, Miss Kavre, Miss Purwanchal and Miss Kathmandu where all the regional winners get a direct entry to top 20 finalists. All three winners will also get a Samsung phone and an apartment at Suncity apartments by Shangrila from this year forward.

The 20 shortlisted young women aged 19 years and above will be competing for the main title and the pageant is scheduled to be held on live telecast on NTV.

Results

Color keys

Sub-titles

Contestants

Previous experience
 (#1) Prinsha Shrestha was Miss Ecollege 2009 1st runner up.
 (#2) Varsha Rai was Miss Purwanchal 2013 2nd runner up.
 (#4) Lakpa Tamang is Miss Tamang 2013.
 (#6) Priyanka Bhandari is the winner of Miss Global International 2012.
 (#7) Neha Bajaj won the regional pageant of Miss Purwanchal 2013.
 (#8) Namita Gurung was Miss Tamusyo 2011.
 (#9) Grishma Basnet won Miss Ecollege 2012.
 (#10) Rashmita Maharjan was the winner of Mega Model Season 2 Winner
 (#11) Sitoshna Ban won the regional contest of Miss Chitwan 2013.
 (#12) Alisha Kunwar was Miss Nepal Global 2012 1st runner up.
 (#15) Rasmi Adhikari won the regional pageant of Miss Pokhara 2013.
 (#17) Aastha Pokharel won Supermodel Nepal 2013 and placed 5th in the first season of Asia's Next Top Model.

References

External links
 Miss Nepal Official Website

Beauty pageants in Nepal
2014 in Nepal
Miss Nepal